Runze Li is an American statistical scientist, currently the Eberly Family Chair Professor in Statistics at Eberly College of Science, Pennsylvania State University.

He became a Fellow of Institute of Mathematical Statistics in 2009, a Fellow of the American Statistical Association in 2011 and a Fellow of the American Association for the Advancement of Science in 2017.

Education
He earned his Ph.D at University of North Carolina at Chapel Hill in 2000.

Research
His highest cited paper is Variable selection via nonconcave penalized likelihood and its oracle properties at 7390 times, according to Google Scholar.

Publications
Fang, K.-T., Li, R. and Sudjianto, A. (2006). Design and Modeling for Computer Experiments. Chapman and Hall/CRC.
Fang, KT, Li, R. and Sujdianto, A. (2005). Design and modeling for computer experiments. CRC Press.
Zou, H., Li, R. One-step sparse estimates in nonconcave penalized likelihood models. Ann Stat. 2008 Aug 1; 36(4): 1509–1533. 
Wang, Hansheng, Li, Runze, Tsai, Chih-Ling. Tuning parameter selectors for the smoothly clipped absolute deviation method. Biometrika, Volume 94, Issue 3, 1 August 2007, Pages 553–568

References

Year of birth missing (living people)
Living people
Pennsylvania State University faculty
American statisticians
Fellows of the American Statistical Association
Annals of Statistics editors